Mark David Nelson (born June 22, 1964) is a former American football offensive tackle who played for the Kansas City Chiefs of the National Football League (NFL). He played college football at three different places, Normandale, Iowa State, and Bowling Green.

Nelson played just one game in his career as a replacement player during the 1987 NFL strike.

After his short career he worked at Toledo Hospital (1988–1992), Muskingum College (1992–1995), Utah State University (1995–2000), and University of Colorado at Boulder (2000–2005), before being hired by the University of Minnesota as the Director of Intercollegiate Academic Counseling and Student Services.

References 

1964 births
Living people
American football offensive tackles
Iowa State Cyclones football players
Bowling Green Falcons football players
Kansas City Chiefs players
National Football League replacement players
Sportspeople from Grand Forks, North Dakota